Dan Ryan is a retired professional Halo player, widely considered one of the greatest professional Halo players of all time. He had 32 Halo championship tournament wins (the second highest of all time) and maintains the position of the highest-average placing professional player in Halo esports history. 

In January 2003, Ryan started his career as a professional Halo gamer under the pseudonym Ogre 1. In 2005, he and his twin brother, Tom Ryan (Ogre 2), won first place in the first international Halo 2 tournament, the World Cyber Games, officially recognizing them as the best Halo 2 players in the world. 

In 2006, he returned with his team as a member of the Major League Gaming (MLG) four-on-four team Final Boss, where they become the most successful professional Halo team of all time. In June 2006, he signed a three-year contract with MLG worth 250,000 dollars, as well as significant sponsorships with both Red Bull and NBA player Gilbert Arenas. R

Ryan has been featured in Electronic Gaming Monthly and BPM. He also appeared in all of the Boost Mobile MLG Pro Circuit episodes on USA Network in 2006.

Early life 
Ryan was born in Pickerington, Ohio and grew up in Columbus, Ohio.

Gaming career 

Ryan began his professional gaming career at age 17, playing at small local tournaments along with Tom Ryan, his twin brother who plays as OGRE 2. The two began to get involved with professional gaming after much success.  Since then, he has been a member of Halo: Combat Evolved, Halo 2 and Halo 3 teams, receiving a significant amount of media and gamer attention for finishing in the top of their tournaments and leagues. Some such teams include Team 3D's Halo 2 team, Team StK, Team  3D, Final Boss. He and his brother also represented the United States in the Halo 2 competition at the 2005 World Cyber Games in Singapore, defeating the Canadian team to secure a first-place finish. 

As part of Final Boss along with OGRE 2, Saiyan, and Walshy, he helped the team to win two consecutive Major League Gaming National Championships in 2004 and 2005, before finishing the 2006 season by placing second to Team Carbon in a close 4–6 match. After this loss, the team dropped Saiyan. Until the arrival of the 2008 season, the Ogre brothers had not finished below 2nd place in a tournament.  As the 2008 season started, it seemed as if Final Boss would pick up where they left off, winning the first Halo 3 event, MLG Meadowlands, by defeating Team Classic. After placing 5th and 7th at the next two events, Final Boss dropped player Walshy to pick up another high-profile player Neighbor, previously with the team Str8 Rippin, 

Ryan formally retired from Final Boss and the professional Halo scene before the start of the 2009 Pro Circuit. He competed casually at Meadowlands 2009 with a group of friends under the team name The Incredibles. He has competed casually and professionally in various Oceania Halo tournaments, once traveling to the MLG Dallas 2012 to compete with the Australian MLG team "Immunity", where they placed 9th-12th, the highest placing ever achieved by an Oceania Halo team.

Personal life 
In 2009 after he retired from professional esports, Ryan moved to Australia where his partner lived. Currently, Ryan lives in Australia with his wife and child. He is a partnered streamer on Twitch, and continues to support the local and international Esports and Halo scene.

Select tournaments

Halo: Combat Evolved

Halo 2

References 

Living people
Halo (franchise) players
People from Columbus, Ohio
American esports players
Final Boss (Halo team) players
American expatriates in Australia
1986 births